Ballyedward is a townland in County Westmeath, Ireland.

Ballyedward is one of 11 townlands of the civil parish of Tyfarnham in the barony of Corkaree in the Province of Leinster.

The neighbouring townlands are: Piercefield (or Templeoran) to the north, Balrath to the north–east, Wattstown to the east and Johnstown to the south and south–west.

In the 1911 census of Ireland there was 1 house and 5 inhabitants in the townland.

References

External links
Map of Ballyedward at openstreetmap.org
Ballyedward at the IreAtlas Townland Data Base
Ballyedward at Townlands.ie
Ballyedward at The Placenames Database of Ireland

Townlands of County Westmeath